Hard Rain may refer to:

 Hard Rain (Bob Dylan album), 1976
 Hard Rain (band), a British rock band
 Hard Rain (Hard Rain album), 1997
 Hard Rain (film), a 1998 action film
 Hard Rain, the name of the fourth campaign of the video game Left 4 Dead 2
 Hard Rain (novel), a 2003 novel by Barry Eisler, since republished as A Lonely Resurrection
 Hard Rain, a late 1980s British band on London Records

See also
 "A Hard Rain's a-Gonna Fall", a 1963 song by Bob Dylan
 Hard Rain Don't Last, 2000 debut album by country music singer Darryl Worley
 Hard Rain Falling, a 1966 crime novel by Don Carpenter
 Heavy Rain, a PlayStation 3 game
 High Land, Hard Rain, 1983 debut album by the band Aztec Camera